Vaccine equity means ensuring that everyone in the world has equal access to vaccines. The importance of vaccine equity has been emphasized by researchers and public health experts during the COVID-19 pandemic but is relevant to other illnesses and vaccines as well.  Historically, world-wide immunization campaigns have led to the eradication of smallpox and significantly reduced polio, measles, tuberculosis, diphtheria, whooping cough, and tetanus.

There are important reasons to establish mechanisms for global vaccine equity. Multiple factors support the development and spread of pandemics, not least the ability of people to travel long distances and widely transmit viruses.  A virus that remains in circulation somewhere in the world is likely to spread and recur in other areas.  The more widespread a virus is, and the larger and more varied the population it affects, the more likely it is to evolve more transmissible, more virulent, and more vaccine resistant variants.  Vaccine equity can be essential to stop both the spread and the evolution of a disease.  Ensuring that all populations receive access to vaccines is a pragmatic means towards achieving global public health.  Failing to do so increases the likelihood of further waves of a disease.

Infectious diseases are disproportionately likely to affect those in low and middle-income neighborhoods and countries (LMICs), making vaccine equity an issue for local and national public health and for foreign policy.  Ethically and morally, access for all to essential medicines such as vaccines is fundamentally related to the human right to health, which is well founded in international law. Economically, vaccine inequity damages the global economy. Supply chains cross borders: areas with very high vaccination rates still depend on areas with lower vaccination rates for goods and services.

Achieving vaccine equity requires addressing inequalities and roadblocks in the production, trade, and health care delivery of vaccines.  Challenges include scaling-up of technology transfer and production, costs of production, safety profiles of vaccines, and anti vaccine disinformation and aggression.

Patterns of vaccine inequality
The wealthy generally have better access to vaccines than the poor, both between and within countries. Within countries, there may be lower rates of vaccination in racial and ethnic minority groups, in rural areas, in older adults, and among those living with disabilities or chronic conditions, in rural communities. Some countries have programs to redress this inequality. Political, economic, social, and diplomatic factors can limit vaccine availability in some countries.

Factors
Achieving control of a disease (such as COVID-19) requires not only developing and licensing vaccines but also producing them at scale, pricing them so that they are globally affordable, allocating them to be available where and when they are needed, and deploying them to local communities.  An effective global approach to achieving vaccine equity must address challenges in the dimensions of vaccine production, allocation, affordability, and deployment.

Doctors Without Borders (MSF) lists five major obstacles to vaccine equity, taking into account that many of those to be vaccinated are children:
 Vaccine prices; new vaccines are on-patent and expensive (affordability)
 Getting vaccines to children; this is expensive and gets even more difficult in conflict zones and natural disasters (affordability, deployment)
 Five clinic visits in the first year of life is often too many; for people in remote areas with many children, it can be much more costly and difficult to get to a clinic. (deployment)
 Keeping vaccines cold; see cold chain. (deployment)
 Age-out; children who don't get vaccinated on-schedule often have to pay for their shots. Disruption from natural disasters or conflict can mean that entire generations go unprotected.(affordability, deployment)

Achieving vaccine equity depends on having a sufficient supply of affordable vaccines available for global use.
Ideally, a vaccine that is suitable for global use will be based on established technology; will have multiple available suppliers of the materials and equipment needed for production; be appropriate to the regions where it is to be produced or deployed, in terms of scalability of production and storage conditions; and be supported by local infrastructure for its production, delivery and regulation.

Vaccine development 
Developing a new drug and gaining regulatory approval for it is a long and expensive process that can involve a variety of stakeholders. The time to develop a new drug can be 10 to 15 years or longer.  The average cost of developing at least one successful epidemic infectious disease vaccine from preclinical to the launch phase, taking into account the cost of failed attempts, has been estimated at from 18.1 million to 1 billion USD.

Decisions about what drugs to develop reflect the priorities of the companies and countries where drug development occurs. As of 2021, the United States was the country launching the highest number of new drugs, and the country with the largest expenditure overall on pharmaceutical discovery, approximately 40% of the research done globally. The United States is also the country with the highest profits for pharmaceutical companies, and the highest drug costs for patients.

Emerging and reemerging viruses substantially affect people in low and middle income countries (LMICs), a pattern that is likely to increase due to climate change. Pharmaceutical companies have few financial incentives to develop treatments for neglected tropical diseases in poor countries.

International organizations such as the World Health Organization, Unicef and the Developing Countries Vaccine Manufacturers Network support development of treatments for diseases such as West Nile virus, dengue fever; Chikungunya,  Middle East respiratory syndrome (MERS), severe acute respiratory syndrome (SARS), Ebola, enterovirus D68 and Zika virus.

Vaccine affordability 
A major factor in the economics of vaccines is intellectual property law. IP currently operates by granting pharmaceutical monopolies lasting decades. The economics of monopoly power give the monopolist a strong financial incentive to use value-based pricing and set prices that many, often most, potential customers can't afford (a pricing strategy that charges what the market will bear, unlike traditional cost-plus pricing charges the cost of production plus a markup). Price discrimination attempts to charge each person the maximum they would be willing to pay, and charges every purchaser more than they would be charged in a fully-competitive market. A vaccine monopolist has no incentive to let the rich actually subsidize the poor. Medical-product monopolists may claim that the high prices charged to the rich subsidize the lower prices charged to the poor when in fact both are being charged well over independent estimates of the cost of production (see, for instance, GeneXpert cartridges and pneumococcal vaccine).

Amnesty International, Oxfam International, and Médecins Sans Frontières (MSF; Doctors without Borders)  have criticized government support of some vaccine monopolies, on the grounds that the monopolies dramatically increase prices and impair vaccine equity. During the COVID-19 pandemic, there were calls for COVID-related IP to be suspended, using the TRIPS Waiver. The waiver had support from most countries, but opposition from within the EU (especially Germany), UK, Norway, and Switzerland, among others.

Vaccine production 
Low and middle income countries tend to lack technological expertise and manufacturing capacity for the production of drugs and medical products.  This leaves them dependent on diagnostics, treatments and vaccines from manufacturers in other countries and on availability in the global market.  There are some exceptions such as China, Cuba, and India, which are actively producing pharmaceuticals to internationally accepted standards. 

The COVID-19 pandemic has led to recommendations to diversify pharmaceutical production and  increase the productive ability of LMICs. This could enable those countries to better ensure that their own production needs are being met, which would help to achieve global vaccine equity.

Potential problems to this can involve:
 Availability of capital, technology and skills
 Adherence to quality standards
 Inconsistent or unsupportive national and international policy frameworks
 Size of markets, purchasing power, and variable demand for vaccines
 Lack of national or local infrastructure (e.g. reliable energy, electricity, transportation)

Even when organizations are willing to share their information, knowledge transfer can create serious delays for the production of vaccines.  This may be particularly true in the case of novel technologies.  LMICs may be better situated to produce vaccines that are based on more established technologies, if those are available.

Vaccine allocation 
In the absence of well-organized systems to develop and distribute vaccines, 
vaccine companies and high income nations may monopolize available resources. 
Organizations such as GAVI,
the Coalition for Epidemic Preparedness Innovations, 
and the World Health Organization have proposed multilateral initiatives such as Covax for the improvement of vaccine allocation. The intention with Covax was to collectively pool resources to ensure vaccine development and production.  The resulting vaccine supplies could be fairly distributed to reach less wealthy countries and achieve vaccine equity.  Foreign aid and resources from richer countries would cover the cost of distributing doses to lower-middle and low income countries.

As an allocation mechanism, Covax has succeeded in distributing Covid-19 vaccines, beginning with a shipment to Ghana on  24 February 2021. In the next year Covax delivered 1.2 billion vaccines to 144 countries. Covax was not able to acquire doses directly from manufacturers at the levels it had hoped. An estimated that 60% of the doses it distributed in 2021 (543 million out of 910 million) were  donated doses from wealthy countries, beginning with the USA (41% of all donated doses).

Covax is an unprecedented initiative, but it has not met the goal of achieving vaccine equity.  Higher income nations bypassed the proposed mechanism and negotiated directly with vaccine manufacturers, leaving Covax without the resources it needed to buy and distribute vaccines in a timely fashion. Smaller and poorer countries had to wait or negotiate for themselves, with varying success. Middle income countries with finances to cover the cost of vaccines still had considerable difficulty in obtaining them.  

Ideally a global vaccine hub could have been developed by the international community before it was needed, rather than under the pressures of a pandemic. Improving it is important in preparation for future health crises. Analyses of Covax' institutional design and governance structures suggest that  it lacked leverage to influence the behavior of donor states and pharmaceutical companies.  It has been suggested that initiatives for vaccine allocation and vaccine equity could be improved by increasing the simplicity, transparency and accountability of their mechanisms. Others argue that such a body needs high-level leadership that is able to act at political and diplomatic levels to address issues of vaccine diplomacy as well as streamlining its mechanisms.

The allocation of vaccines and the issue of wastage are related. When high income countries buy more than they use, doses go to waste. If higher income countries donate near-expiration doses to lower income countries, those doses may expire before they can be effectively reallocated and used. This type of closed vial wastage could be reduced, through the improvement of supply chain management within countries, the internationally coordinated monitoring and tracking of  vaccines, and well-organized systems for the timely donation and reallocation of surplus vaccines.
 
Open vial wastage, which occurs when only part of a vial of vaccine is used, could also be reduced.  Strategies include making less doses available in a single vial, and organizing appointments to more effectively ensure that doses are used by overbooking (since some people will not appear) or not booking (so that only those who do appear receive doses).

Vaccine deployment 
Barriers to deployment may be both physical and mental. In addition to supply and demand, barriers to immunization can include systems barriers related to organization of the health care system; health care provider barriers relating to availability and education of health care staff; and patient barriers around a parent or patient's fears or beliefs about immunization. 

Cheap vaccines are often not administered due to a lack of infrastructure funding.  
Logistical difficulties are an obstacle to achieving global vaccine equity. Hot climates, remote regions, and low-resource settings need cheap, transportable, easy-to-use vaccines.
To achieve vaccine equity, vaccine development needs to prioritize concerns about whether a vaccine can survive outside a fridge or be administered in a single shot.   

To reach communities and successfully deploy a vaccine and achieve vaccine equity, it is important to take a “human-centered” public health approach that can address and respond to the concerns of local individuals and organizations. For example, vaccines could be made available by going to where people live, and partnering with houses of worship and other community centers, rather than relying on people to travel to hospitals or doctor's offices. In Laos, measures taken included repairing roads to remote areas, buying vans with modern refrigeration to transport vaccines, and visiting residences, temples, and schools to discuss the importance of vaccination.

As part of Laos' public health campaign, President Thongloun Sisoulith was publicly vaccinated, on television, to encourage others to follow his example. Working with leaders and trusted community members within communities who can present important information and  publicly identify and counter misinformation can be very successful. This type of approach was used in India, which was certified as free of poliomyelitis in 2014. In that public health campaign, 98% of the “social mobilizers”  involved were women, whose involvement was critical.

Vaccine messaging
Communicating about public health risks is more effective when a message involves three or four specific talking points, which are then backed up with evidence. An initial message may focus on what is happening, what to do, and how to do it, followed up by details and how to find more information. 

Part of effective communication is to avoid confusing or overwhelming people. A simple message can be followed by more complex ones.  Messages should be clear about the limits of what is known: explicitly identifying the boundaries of evolving knowledge rather than speculating and sending out conflicting and confusing messages.

Often, the most useful and effective communication comes from local officials and people with expertise who know their community and the issue involved well.
It is important to be aware of and address issues such as medical disparities, abuse, neglect, and disinformation that may affect communities. Disinformation tends to thrive under conditions of confusion, distrust and disenfranchisement. Countering disinformation is not just a matter of presenting facts and figures. People need to feel heard and their concerns need to be considered.

COVID-19

Priorly developed work for other coronaviruses allowed the COVID-19 vaccination development team to have a head start, speeding up development and trials. Specifically, COVID-19 vaccination development began in January 2020. On May 15, 2020, Operation Warp Speed was announced as a partnership between the United States Department of Health and Human Services and the Department of Defense.  $18 Billion was contracted out to eight different companies to develop COVID-19 vaccinations intended for the US population; major companies included where Moderna, Pfizer, and Johnson & Johnson. These three companies received the earliest emergency use approval from the FDA, therefore being the most common vaccinations in the United States.

Vaccine inequality has been a major concern in the COVID-19 pandemic, with most vaccines being reserved by wealthy countries, including vaccines manufactured in developing countries. Globally, the problem has been distribution; supply is adequate. Not all countries have the ability to produce the vaccine. 
In low-income countries, vaccination rates long remained almost zero. This has caused sickness and death.

Vaccine inequity during the COVID-19 pandemic showed the disparity between minority groups and countries. Based on income and rural or urban setting, vaccination rates were vastly disproportionate. As of 19 March 2022, 79% of people in high income countries had received one or more doses of a covid-19 vaccine, compared with just 14% of people in low income countries. By April 25, 2022, 15.2% of people in low income countries had received at least one dose, while overall globally 65.1% of the global population had received at least one dose.

Throughout the data of COVID-19 vaccination records, rates have consistently been much lower for lower income groups than that of middle and higher income groups. COVID-19 vaccination rates are higher in urban settings, and lower in rural settings. In an underdeveloped country such as Nigeria, vaccination rates are under 11% nationally. Because of persistent vaccine inequity, many countries continue to not have access to free or affordable COVID-19 vaccinations.

Our World in Data provides up to date statistics of COVID-19 vaccine access between nations, socioeconomic groups, and more.

In September 2021, it was estimated that the world would have manufactured enough vaccines to vaccinate everyone on the planet by January 2022. Vaccine hoarding, booster shots, a lack of funding for vaccination infrastructure, and other forms of inequality mean that it is expected that many countries will still have inadequate vaccination.

On August 4, 2021, the United Nations called for a moratorium on booster doses in high-income countries, so that low-income countries can be vaccinated. The World Health Organization repeated these criticisms of booster shots on the 18th, saying "we're planning to hand out extra life-jackets to people who already have life-jackets while we're leaving other people to drown without a single life jacket". UNICEF supported a "Donate doses now" campaign.

On 29 January 2022, Pope Francis denounced the "distortion of reality based on fear" that has ripped across the world during the COVID-19 pandemic. He urged journalists to help those misled by coronavirus-related misinformation and fake news to better understand the scientific facts.

See also
 Economics of vaccines
 Vaccine resistance
 GAVI
 COVAX
 CEPI
 Developing Countries Vaccine Manufacturers Network

References

Vaccination
Public health